The Triumph TR3 is a British sports car produced between 1955 and 1962 by the Standard-Triumph Motor Company of Coventry, England. A traditional roadster, the TR3 is an evolution of the company's earlier TR2 model, with greater power and improved braking. Updated variants, popularly but unofficially known as the "TR3A" and "TR3B", entered production in 1957 and 1962 respectively. The TR3 was succeeded by the Michelotti-styled, mechanically similar Triumph TR4.

The rugged ‘sidescreen’ TR, so named for its employment of removable plexiglass side curtains, was a sales and motorsport success. With approximately 74,800 TR3s sold across all variants, the model was the company's third best seller in the TR range, behind the TR7 (111,500 units) and TR6 (94,500 units) models. The Triumph was campaigned in races, hill climbs, and rallies across Europe and North America, with several outright, team, and class victories to its credit.

TR3

Although the car was usually supplied as an open two-seater, an occasional rear seat and bolt-on steel hard top were available as extras.

The car is powered by the Standard wet liner inline four, a  straight-four OHV engine initially producing , an increase of 5 hp over the TR2 thanks to larger SU-H6 carburettors. This was later increased to 100 bhp at 5000 rpm by the addition of a "high port" cylinder head and enlarged manifold. The four-speed manual gearbox could be supplemented by an overdrive unit on the top three ratios, electrically operated and controlled by a switch on the dashboard. In 1956, the front brakes were changed from drums to discs, a first for a British series production car.

The suspension is by double A-arms, manganese bronze trunnion, coil springs and tube shocks at the front, optional anti-roll bar, and with worm and peg steering. Unlike MGs of the same period, the steering mechanism and linkage have considerable play and friction, which increase with wear.

The rear is conventional leaf springs, with solid axle and lever arm dampers, except that the (box) frame rails are slung under the axle. The wheels are 15 inches in diameter and 4.5 inches wide (increased from 4 inches after the first few TR2s), with 48-spoke wire wheels optional. Wire wheels were usually painted, either body colour or argent (silver), but matte chrome and bright chrome were also available.

The TR3's weight is significantly more than the Morgan +4 and the Porsche 356, but not much more than the MGA and MGB. All except the Morgan, which shares the same engine, are substantially less powerful, as is the Sunbeam Alpine.

Under most conditions the car is very responsive and forgiving, but it has some handling issues. The chassis, which is shared by the TR2, TR3, TR3A and TR4 has limited wheel travel. As a result, on very hard cornering, the inside rear wheel can lift, causing sudden over-steer due to the increased load on the outside rear tyre. This is particularly true with radial tyres; the original TR2/3/3A suspension was built for crossply tyres. The wheel lifting is more sudden than that of other cars, because it is caused by coming to the end of the suspension travel while there is still load on the tyre, so the load on the other (outside) rear wheel is a discontinuous function of cornering load, rather than just changing slope.

The TR3 is a true roadster, designed for sunny weather but with removable rain protection. It has a convertible hood (US top) that snaps on and off and removable side curtains, allowing very low doors with padding for the driver's arm to rest on. There are holes in the floor, with rubber plugs, so that the originally supplied jack might be used from inside the car, as did the Jaguar XK120. The optional heater is poor, and the shut-off valve is under the bonnet (US hood). There is room for a third person or child sitting sideways behind the seats, but no accommodation for them.

Some 13,377 examples of the original "pre-facelift" TR3 were produced, of which 1,286 were sold within the UK; the rest were exported mainly to the USA. As of Q1 2011 there were approximately 826 licensed and 115 SORN TR3/3as registered with the DVLA.

Specifications
Production period – October 1955 to Summer 1957
Original price (basic model) – £950
Suspension – Front: independent by unequal-length double wishbones, coil springs and telescopic dampers. Rear: live axle, half-elliptic springs, lever arm dampers.
Brakes – First 4408 models (1955–56):  drums all around. Remaining 9000 (1956–57): front discs; rear drums 
Factory options and extras – Triumph offered a wide range of optional parts and accessories for both the competition-minded enthusiast and those simply wishing to personalize their vehicle. While many of these items were factory fitments, local dealers supplied some as well. Among these were: overdrive, wire wheels (48-spoke, 60-spoke available from 1959), steel hardtop kit (part No. 900711), occasional rear seat (No. 801264), push-button radio, interior heater, leather upholstery, windscreen washer (No. 553729), cast aluminium sump (No. 502126),  engine (from 1959), aluminum ‘Al-fin’ brake drums (No. 202267 or No. 301590 (9- and 10-inch respectively)), spot and fog lamps (Nos. 501703, 501702), and a continental touring kit (No. 502022, spares for travels in remote regions).
Tyres - 5.50-15 crossply or 155HR15 Pirelli Cinturato CA67

Performance
The test car cost £1,103 including taxes.

Other figures recorded included:

From standing to  mile 18.1 secs

TR3A

In 1957 the TR3 was updated with various changes including a full width radiator grille and this facelifted model was commonly referred to as the Triumph "TR3A". However the cars were not badged as such and the "TR3A" name was not used officially, as is evident from contemporary sales brochures.
The "TR3A" was built between 1957 and 1962.

The "TR3A" was a minor update from the TR3. The updates included the new wide front grill, exterior door handles, lockable boot handle and came with a full tool kit as standard (this was an option on the TR3). The total production run of the "TR3A" was 58,236. This makes it the third best-selling TR after the TR6 and TR7. The TR3A was so successful that the original panel moulds eventually wore out and had to be replaced. In 1959 a slightly modified version came out that had raised stampings under the bonnet and boot hinges and under the door handles, as well as a redesigned rear floor section. In addition, the windscreen was attached with bolts rather than the Dzus connectors used on the early "A" models. It is estimated that only 9,500 of the original 58,000 built survive today.

The Triumph TR3 is the first production car to include standard disc brakes, which were continued on the "TR3A" facelift. The car was known for its superior braking ability with its larger tyres (5.90-15 crossply or 165HR15 Pirelli Cinturato), making it an autocross favorite. 

The "TR3A" is often seen in vintage and production racing today. The "TR3A", despite being over 50 years old, is still competitive in the E-production class of SCCA (Sports Car Club of America).

In June 1977, Road & Track magazine published an article titled "Driving Impressions: TR3A & TR250" in its 30th anniversary issue.

TR3B

The "Triumph TR3B" is an unofficial name given to the final version of the TR3, which was produced in 1962. It was offered concurrent with the TR4, which started production in 1961. The "TR3B" was a special short-production run in response to dealer concerns that the buying public might not welcome the TR4.

It had the body of the later "TR3A". Two series were produced: one with a commission number preceded by TSF of which 530 were produced. Of these 530 the last 29 were built as Triumph Italia's; one with commission numbers preceded by TCF of which 2804 were produced. Both series were partly produced in parallel. The TSF series were identical to the last run of TR3As, so with a two-litre engine and non-synchronized 1st gear transmission. The TCF series has the 2.138-litre TR4 engine. The engine is a straight-four, push rod, three-bearing, with wet liners. It has 9:1 compression and is very rigid. It was fitted with two H6 SU carburetors. Electrically triggered overdrive (Laycock-de-Normanville Type A) was available as an option and operates on second, third, and fourth gears. Appearance is identical to the late US-version of the "TR3A", with the same wider head light rims, for the rest very similar to the TR3, except for a wider grille and door handles. It weighs .

TR3 in motorsport competition
Building on the enviable legacy of the Triumph TR2, the TR3 enjoyed much success in international motorsport competition.

After the events of the 1955 ‘24 Heures du Mans’ , the French government moved to prohibit sports car rallying in that country, rallies then little more than long distance road races. In response, Triumph competition manager Ken Richardson had steel hard tops bolted to 100 TR3's, homologating the new sports car as a "grand touring" coupe, the GT class still permitted to race on French public roadways. A ‘grand touring kit’ was made available to customers as an optional extra (part No. 554313).

TR3s were campaigned in the RAC, Monte Carlo, Circuit of Ireland, Alpine, Liege-Rome-Liege, International Tulip, Scheveningen-Luxembourg, Tour de France, Douze Heures de Huy, Lyon-Charbonnieres, Acropolis, Chimay National, and Corsica rallies, among others, achieving numerous outright, team, and class victories including six "Coupes des Alpes" awards. With its robust engine and rugged reliability, the TR was a popular competitor in continental hill climbs, such as the Ollon Villars and Eberbach Bergrennen, and endurance races like the 12 Hours of Sebring and the Mille Miglia.

In 1959, three extensively modified TR3s, referred to as ‘TR3S’ models, were run at the 24H du Mans. Resembling the production TR3, the Le Mans cars employed glass fibre body shells, were six inches longer than the production vehicle, and powered by the prototype  twin-cam ‘Sabrina’ engine. The Jopp/Stoop TR3S reached as high as seventh place overall before being forced to retire for mechanical difficulties with just over an hour remaining in the race.

References

External links

 Informational website dedicated to the Triumph TR3

TR3
Cars introduced in 1955
Cars discontinued in 1962
Sports racing cars
Roadsters
Rear-wheel-drive vehicles
24 Hours of Le Mans race cars